Karl Wilhelm Lauterbach (born 21 February 1963) is a German scientist, physician, and politician of the Social Democratic Party of Germany (SPD) who has served as Federal Minister of Health since 8 December 2021. He is professor of health economics and epidemiology at the University of Cologne (on leave since 2005). Since the 2005 federal elections, he has been a Member of the Bundestag (the federal parliament of Germany). During the COVID-19 pandemic, his name became well known in Germany, through his frequent appearances on television talk shows as an invited guest expert, along with his frequent use of Twitter to provide commentary about the ongoing pandemic.

Education and career 
Lauterbach studied human medicine at the RWTH Aachen University, University of Texas at San Antonio and University of Düsseldorf, where he graduated. From 1989 to 1992, he studied health policy and management as well as epidemiology at the Harvard School of Public Health in Boston, graduating with a Doctor of Science in 1992. From 1992 to 1993, he held a fellowship at the Harvard Medical School, sponsored by the Konrad Adenauer Foundation, which is close to the CDU. Lauterbach was a CDU member for several years before joining the SPD in 2001.

From 1998 until 2005, Lauterbach served as the director of the Institute of Health Economics and Clinical Epidemiology (IGKE) at the University of Cologne, and was subsequently on leave from that role due to his tenure in the Bundestag. He was appointed adjunct professor at the Harvard School of Public Health in 2008. He was a member of the Sachverständigenrat zur Begutachtung der Entwicklung im Gesundheitswesen (the council of experts advising the federal government on developments in the German healthcare system) from 1999 until he was elected to the Bundestag in September 2005. He was a member of the Rürup Commission, a government-appointed committee of experts that was established to review the financing of the social insurance systems.

Bundestag career

In opposition (16th and 17th Bundestag)
Lauterbach made his entry to the Bundestag with a direct mandate by winning in his electoral district Leverkusen – Cologne IV at the 2005 federal elections. Between 2005 and 2013, he served on the Health Committee. Within the SPD parliamentary group, Lauterbach belongs to the Parliamentary Left, a left-wing movement.

Shadow minister of health (18th and 19th Bundestag)
Ahead of the 2013 federal elections, Peer Steinbrück included Lauterbach in his shadow cabinet for the SPD's campaign to unseat incumbent Chancellor Angela Merkel. During the campaign, he served as shadow minister of health. In the negotiations to form a government following the elections, he led the SPD delegation in the health working group and his co-chair from the CDU/CSU was Jens Spahn. From 2013 until 2019, he served as deputy chairman of the SPD parliamentary group under the leadership of successive chairpersons Thomas Oppermann (2013–2017) and Andrea Nahles (2017–2019).

Appointed by Federal Minister of Health Hermann Gröhe, Lauterbach served as member of an expert commission on the reform of Germany's hospital care from 2015 until 2017. From 2018 until 2019, he chaired an expert commission advising Mayor of Berlin Michael Müller on strategies for the city's health sector.

Covid-19 advisor to Merkel
During the COVID-19 pandemic, Lauterbach quickly rose to national prominence. He served as an advisor of  Chancellor Angela Merkel during the pandemic. He became well known to a wide audience through his frequency of appearancesan unsurpassed 30 by 17 December 2020as guest expert in talk shows, as well as his frequent use of Twitter. Early on in the pandemic, during the first lockdown from April to June 2020, he often cautioned against the negative effects of premature relaxation of restrictions. Later he was one of those who warned early of a second wave of the pandemic. In August 2021, he criticized state governmentseducation is managed by individual states in Germanyfor what he saw as their poor pandemic preparation for the upcoming school year, and proposed to limit travelling by long-distance trains to those with a recent negative COVID-19 test, the vaccinated, and the recovered (the '3G rule'). For his views he became the target of intense hatred by many critics and anti-vaxxers, frequently receiving death threats. However, his reputation was believed to have contributed to his strong result in the 2021 federal election.

Minister of Health (20th Bundestag)
In the 2021 German federal election, Lauterbach comfortably won the seat in Leverkusen and thus secured his return to the Bundestag, in spite of not having been nominated at a top place in the SPD's party list. In the negotiations to form a so-called traffic light coalition of the SPD, the Green Party and the Free Democratic Party (FDP) following the 2021 federal elections, Lauterbach was part of his party's delegation in the working group on health, co-chaired by Katja Pähle, Maria Klein-Schmeink and Christine Aschenberg-Dugnus.

On 6 December 2021, Lauterbach was designated as Federal Minister of Health in the traffic light coalition. He assumed the office on 8 December 2021 when the Scholz cabinet was formally appointed by President Frank-Walter Steinmeier. Due to Lauterbach's high profile in Germany as a media commentator on the COVID-19 pandemic, The Economist'''s Berlin correspondent Tom Nuttall described his nomination to the cabinet as "perhaps the most eagerly awaited health minister appointment in the history of the democratic world".

On 8 December 2021 at his formal induction ceremony Lauterbach said: "Health policy, as I see it, can only be successful when it’s anchored in evidence-based medicine."

On 10 December 2021 the Bundestag passed a health-care worker Covid-19 vaccine law which was to come into effect on 15 March 2022. Lauterbach told the Bundestag that: "Such a vaccine mandate is necessary because it is completely unacceptable that at the end of the second year of this pandemic, people who live in care homes die unnecessarily because workers there are unvaccinated."

On 11 December 2021 the Washington Post celebrated Lauterbach's appointment to Health Minister. Its headline read "Germany’s ‘Fauci,’ a Harvard-educated doctor, gets ready to tackle the pandemic", while it noted that the Health Ministry has an annual 56 billion euro budget.

A week into his tenure during a visit to Hanover, Lauterbach expressed concerns that Germany might be headed towards a much stronger fifth wave of COVID-19 infections, specifically for the omicron variant. He also said he expected the country to suffer from a vaccine shortage in the first quarter.

In January 2022 Lauterbach raised the covid-19 vaccination rate target to achieve "so-called herd immunity" against the coronavirus.

In a January 2022 interview with Die Welt am Sonntag Lauterbach stated that he wanted to vaccinate for Covid-19 every German and said: "We cannot get into a situation where one summer is deceptively good, but new variants surprise us in the autumn – and without the broad majority of the population being vaccinated."

On 12 April 2022 Lauterbach was disappointed when he failed to pass through the Bundestag a law which would have made COVID-19 vaccines mandatory for people over 60 years of age. In total, 378 members of the Bundestag voted against the law, while 296 supported it. The bill as it had been originally proposed would have made all adults subject to the needle, and it would have established compulsory propaganda counselling sessions for all adults.

On 14 April 2022 prosecutors announced publicly that they had detained four people suspected of plotting to kidnap Lauterbach and destroy power facilities to cause a nationwide power outage.

On 18 May 2022 Lauterbach announced government plans to spend an additional 830 million euros on coronavirus vaccines.

On 19 May 2022 Lauterbach expressed his approval of the Federal Constitutional Court's ruling that Covid-19 vaccines could be mandated for health workers, in the following words: "the state is obliged to protect vulnerable groups."

In August 2022 Lauterbach announced his plans to submit for Parliamentary approval a new wave of Covid-19 measures: masks would be mandatory on planes, trains and long-distance buses from October 2022 to April 2023. Mask would be mandatory indoor public events, on local public transportation, and in schools.

On 13 October 2022 the ringleader of the plot to kidnap Lauterbach was arrested. Plotters were opposed to the government’s covid-19 measures, and they were intent on "triggering civil war-like conditions in Germany and thus ultimately bringing about the overthrow of the federal government and parliamentary democracy."

On 26 October 2022 Lauterbach presented a cornerstone paper on planned legislation to regulate the controlled distribution and consumption of cannabis for recreational purposes among adults.

On 28 November 2022 Lauterbach was said to be one of the main targets of a suspected terrorist group of conspirators, which was rounded up by German police. The terrorist group planned, among other things, his kidnapping. The terrorists planned to act during a talk show appearance of his, and in the further course a coup should be provoked.

 Other activities 
 Corporate boards 
 Rhön-Klinikum, member of the supervisory board (2005–2013)

 Non-profit organizations 
 German Foundation for Consumer Protection, member of the Board of Trustees (since 2019)
 Muhanna-Stiftung, member of the Board of Trustees
 German United Services Trade Union (ver.di), member

 Political positions
Lauterbach is a strong advocate of the so-called Bürgerversicherung'', mainly favoured by the Social Democrats. The idea includes the reorganization of the German health system and the incorporation of all people and all income groups into the financing of the health care system.

Along with Swen Schulz, Otto Fricke, Katrin Helling-Plahr and Petra Sitte, Lauterbach was one of the authors of a cross-party initiative in 2021 to liberalize the legal framework for assisted suicide in Germany.

2019 leadership bid
In the 2019 SPD leadership election, Lauterbach announced his intention to run for the position as the party's co-chair, together with Nina Scheer. He has since been serving on the German Parliament's Committee on Legal Affairs and Consumer Protection and its Subcommittee on European Law.

Undeclared income 
In May 2021, several months ahead of the national elections, Lauterbach admitted on Twitter that he had been late to declare to the German Parliament's administration a total of 17,850 euros in additional income he had received the previous year as an advance payment for a book deal.

Awards 
In 2020 Lauterbach was awarded with die Salomon Neumann medal by the German society for social medicine and prevention DGSMP. 

In 2022 he won the social media award Der Goldene Blogger as "Twitter account of the year".

Personal life 
In 1996, Lauterbach married epidemiologist and physician Angela Spelsberg. They have four children together. The two divorced in 2010 after having separated in 2004. Lauterbach has a further child from another relationship.

References

External links 

 Official Website 

1963 births
Living people
German public health doctors
Harvard School of Public Health alumni
Harvard University staff
Health ministers of Germany
Members of the Bundestag for North Rhine-Westphalia
Members of the Bundestag 2021–2025
Members of the Bundestag 2017–2021
Members of the Bundestag 2013–2017
Members of the Bundestag 2009–2013
Members of the Bundestag 2005–2009
Members of the Bundestag for the Social Democratic Party of Germany
People from Düren
RWTH Aachen University alumni